Peloche is a village located in the municipality of Herrera del Duque, in Badajoz province, Extremadura, Spain. As of 2020, it has a population of 208.

Geography 
Peloche is located 180km east-northeast of Badajoz.

References

Populated places in the Province of Badajoz